Nan Inger Östman (22 January 1923 – 8 April 2015) was a Swedish author, primarily of children's literature. She was awarded the Astrid Lindgren Prize in 1987.

References

Further reading  
 

1923 births
2015 deaths
Swedish children's writers
Swedish women children's writers
Swedish-language writers
20th-century Swedish novelists
20th-century Swedish women writers